Vineyard is a city in Utah County, Utah, United States. It is part of the Provo–Orem Metropolitan Statistical Area. The population grew from 139 at the 2010 census to 12,543 at the 2020 census making it the fastest growing city in Utah and one of the fastest-growing cities in the nation during that timeframe. Population has grown dramatically since about 2012 due to redevelopment of the former Geneva Steel site which sits in Vineyard.

History
The community was named for grape vineyards near the original town site. According to some town residents, Vineyard first became a distinct place in 1899. The town incorporated in 1989.
Vineyard was certified as a city of the 5th class (1,000 - 10,000 residents) during the summer of 2016. Prior to 2016, Vineyard was classified as a town.

Population has grown dramatically since about 2012 due to redevelopment of the former Geneva Steel site which sits in Vineyard. In 2014 Utah Valley University purchased 125 acres of the Geneva Steel site in order to expand to a new “West” Campus.

Geography
, or 31.53%, is water.

Demographics

As of the census of 2020, there were 12,543 people living in Vineyard. The racial makeup of the city was 81.5% White alone, 2.5% Black or African American alone, and 4.2% from two or more races. Hispanic or Latino of any race were 10.2% of the population.

In 2000, there were 43 households, out of which 30.2% had children under the age of 18 living with them, 83.7% were married couples living together, 4.7% had a female householder with no husband present, and 11.6% were non-families. 11.6% of all households were made up of individuals, and 7.0% had someone living alone who was 65 years of age or older. The average household size was 3.49 and the average family size was 3.76.

In 2020, 33.8% of the population was under 18 years old (including 14.4% under 5) and 1.1% of the population was over 65 years old. 7.8% of the population was foreign born. The median income for a household in the city was $80,868 (in 2020 dollars). The per capita income for the city was $29,004. 9.3% of the population was below the poverty line.

According to the US Census 2015 Population Estimate Vineyard had the fastest growth from 2013 to 2014 and from 2014 to 2015 of any city or town in the entire USA with a 417% growth. The second highest growth was only 59%.

Education

Vineyard Public Schools are part of the Alpine School District. 
 Vineyard Elementary (K-6 Public)
 Trailside Elementary (K-6 Public)

Charter
 Franklin Discovery Academy (K-6 Charter)
 Freedom Preparatory Academy (K-5 Charter)

Recreation

Parks 
 Gammon Park
 Lakeside Sports Park (West side)
 Sunset Beach Park
 Vineyard Grove Park
 Penny Springs Park
 Rendezvous Park

Active transportation 
Vineyard has an extensive trail system. The city was awarded a Bronze level Bicycle Friendly Community award in 2020 by the League of American Bicyclists for its efforts to promote walking and biking in the city.

Notable people 
 Reed Holdaway, orthodontist
 Chief Walkara

References

External links
 City of Vineyard official website

 
Cities in Utah
Provo–Orem metropolitan area
Populated places established in 1899
Cities in Utah County, Utah